Michelini is an Italian surname, derived from the given name Michele. Notable people with the surname include:

 Alberto Michelini (born 1941), Italian journalist and politician
 Arturo Michelini (1909–1969), Italian politician
 Danilo Michelini (1917–1983), Italian footballer
 Famiano Michelini (1604–1665), Italian mathematician
 Flavien Michelini (born 1986), French footballer
 Gian Carlo Michelini (born 1935), Italian-Taiwanese Roman Catholic priest
 Giovanni Battista Michelini (1604–1655), Italian painter
 Giulia Michelini (born 1985), Italian actress 
 Ottavio Michelini (1906–1979), Italian Roman Catholic priest
 Rafael Michelini (born 1958), Uruguayan politician
 Stéphanie Michelini, French actress
 Zelmar Michelini (1924–1976), Uruguayan reporter and politician

Italian-language surnames
Patronymic surnames
Surnames from given names